The 1932 United States Senate election in Pennsylvania was held on November 8, 1932. Incumbent Republican U.S. Senator James J. Davis successfully sought re-election, defeating Democratic nominee Lawrence H. Rupp.

General election

Candidates
James J. Davis, incumbent U.S. Senator (Republican)
Edwin J. Fithian (Prohibition)
Lawrence H. Rupp, Grand Exalted Ruler of the Benevolent and Protective Order of Elks (Democratic)
Harry M. Wicks (Communist)

Results

See also 

 United States Senate elections, 1932 and 1933

References

1932
Pennsylvania
United States Senate